To My Wonderful One is an album by American singer Tony Bennett. It was originally recorded in 1959 and released in 1960 on Columbia as CL 1429.

Track listing
"Wonderful One" - (Paul Whiteman, Ferde Grofé, Theodora Morse, Marshall Neilan) - 3:17
"Till" (Charles Danvers, Carl Sigman) - 3:00
"September Song" (Kurt Weill, Maxwell Anderson) - 3:53
"Suddenly" (Dorcas Cochran, Richard Heuberger) - 3:07
"I'm a Fool to Want You" (Frank Sinatra, Jack Wolf, Joel S. Herron) - 3:21
"We Mustn't Say Goodbye" (Al Dubin, James V. Monaco) - 3:15
"Autumn Leaves" (Johnny Mercer, Joseph Kosma, Jacques Prevert) - 3:32
"Laura" (Johnny Mercer, David Raksin) - 3:05
"April in Paris" (Vernon Duke, E. Y. Harburg) - 2:34
"Speak Low" (Kurt Weill, Ogden Nash) - 2:48
"Tenderly" (Walter Gross, Jack Lawrence) - 3:36
"Last Night When We Were Young" (Harold Arlen, E. Y. Harburg) - 2:55

Recorded on October 23 (#6), November 10 (#1, 7-8, 11), November 11 (#2-3, 10) and November 12 (#4-5, 9, 12) 1959.

Personnel
Tony Bennett – vocals
Frank De Vol - conductor, arranger
Ralph Sharon - piano
Al Caiola, Billy Bean, Al Casamenti, Tony Mottola, Dan Perri, Bucky Pizzarelli - guitar
Janet Soyer - harp
Frank Carroll, Don Payne - bass
H. Breuer, Bradley Spinney - percussion
Panama Francis - drums

Strings
Seymour Barab, Maurice Bialkin, David Soyer - violoncello
Rudolph Bocheo, Al Breuning, Fred Buldrini, Max Cahn, Alexander Cores, Arnold Eidus, James A. Grasso, Emanuel Green, Leo Kahn, Harry Katzman, Leo Kruczek, George Ockner, Samuel Rand, A. Rudnitzky, Tosha Samoroff, D. Sarcer, Julius Schachter, Maurice Wilk, Paul Winter, Harry Zarief, Jack Zayde - violin
Sidney Brecher, Richard Dickler - viola

References

1960 albums
Tony Bennett albums
Albums conducted by Frank De Vol
Albums arranged by Frank De Vol
Albums produced by Mitch Miller
Columbia Records albums